"Echo" is the third single off rapper Gorilla Zoe's second studio album, Don't Feed Da Animals. Gorilla Zoe uses an Auto-Tune effect for this song. The  song was released on iTunes March 10, 2009 and was produced by Drumma Boy. The official remix features Diddy and another with Ne-Yo and Yung Joc.

Chart positions

References

2009 singles
Bad Boy Records singles
Gorilla Zoe songs
Song recordings produced by Drumma Boy
2009 songs
Songs written by Drumma Boy
Songs written by Gorilla Zoe